Flame of the West may refer to:

Flame of the West (1945 film), directed by Lambert Hillyer and starring Johnny Mack Brown
Flame of the West (2008 film), a short film directed by Hannah Cowley
The Flame of the West (1918 film), a short film directed by William V. Mong
Andúril, a fictitious sword in The Lord of the Rings, reforged as Quenya: "Flame of the West"